Dunbridge is an unincorporated community in eastern Middleton Township, Wood County, Ohio, United States.  It has a post office with the ZIP code 43414.

Dunbridge was laid out in 1882 by Robert Dunn, and named by combining the names of two early settlers: Dunn and Trowbridge.

References

Unincorporated communities in Wood County, Ohio
Unincorporated communities in Ohio